Eigerøy Church is a parish church of the Church of Norway in Eigersund Municipality in Rogaland county, Norway. It is located on the island of Eigerøya. It is the church for the Eigerøy parish which is part of the Dalane prosti (deanery) in the Diocese of Stavanger. The white, wooden church was built in a modern style in 1998. The building was consecrated on 30 August 1998.

See also
List of churches in Rogaland

References

Eigersund
Churches in Rogaland
Wooden churches in Norway
20th-century Church of Norway church buildings
Churches completed in 1998
1998 establishments in Norway